Enotocleptes is a genus of longhorn beetles of the subfamily Lamiinae, containing the following species:

 Enotocleptes denticollis (Fauvel, 1906)
 Enotocleptes intermicollis Breuning, 1940

References

Parmenini